Ang Tanging Pamilya: A Marry Go Round (lit. "The Only Family, A Marry Go Round") is a 2009 Philippine comedy film produced by Star Cinema, starring  Ai-Ai delas Alas, and Former Philippine President Joseph Estrada . It also features the popular loveteam of Sam Milby and Toni Gonzaga, and Dionisia Pacquiao's first film portrayal. Before the set of the Ang Tanging Pamilya: A Marry Go Round, director Wenn Deramas said that the film will be a Filipino version of the American film, Meet the Fockers, but with more funny moments inside it.

Contrary to public perception, the film is actually not a continuation of Ang Tanging Ina N'yong Lahat (2008).  Rather, the movie adds to Ai Ai de las Alas's list of "Ina" movies; hence her respectively being deemed as a "Tanging Ina."

Plot
The film starts when Sunshine Sicat (Ai-Ai delas Alas), who is on her way to her wedding, but was too late for all the wedding guests went home. On her second attempt to have a wedding, her groom, Dindo (Joseph Estrada) helped a pregnant woman who was in trouble. He came and apologized to Sunshine and decided to have a civil wedding instead. They have 5 sons and a daughter named Charlie (Toni Gonzaga). Charlie meets Prince (Sam Milby) on the road, but her father Dindo refuses to have Prince as his daughter's boyfriend. However, her mother Sunshine prefers to have her daughter be with a man who is worth it. Suddenly, Prince goes to United States with his family. He and Charlie decide to have a long-distance relationship through the internet. Prince came and proposed to Charlie. Dindo is refusing to have his only daughter to marry, and did not stop meddling between Prince and Charlie. Prince did everything to impress Dindo where he eventually relents for his daughter's happiness. Then came Prince's parents from Hawaii. His mother Marlene (Dionisia Pacquiao) started to have a close fight with Sunshine for the wedding preparations. On the day of the wedding, Dindo was having a problem with his jeepney terminal, when a pregnant woman came again. When Dindo and Prince arrived, it was too late. Dindo and Sunshine had a misunderstanding while Prince and Charlie called-off their wedding. Sunshine told Charlie that Prince is leaving. They rushed and followed Prince where he proposed again and fell in love again. On the day of Charlie's wedding, another surprise came, Dindo and Sunshine finally had their Church wedding. The double wedding happened and Marlene got both flowers.

Cast
 Ai-Ai delas Alas as Sunshine Sicat
 Joseph Estrada as Dindo Sicat
 Toni Gonzaga as Carlitoia "Charlie" Sicat
 Sam Milby as Prince Price 
 Dionisia Pacquiao as Marlene 
 Miguel Faustmann as Marlene's Husband
 Janus del Prado as Jestoni Sicat
 AJ Perez† as Ernie Sicat
 Thou Reyes as Andrew E. Sicat
 Igiboy Flores as Aga Sicat
 Carl Camo as Vandolph Sicat
 Miguelito de Guzman as Buboy Sicat
 DJ Durano as Archie
 Candy Pangilinan as Ka-Away
 Empoy Marquez as Ka-Bado
 K Brosas as Deling
 Carla Humphries as Andi
 Tessie Moreno as Sunshine's Mother
 Lou Veloso as Sunshine's Father
 Jinggoy Estrada as Young Dindo Sicat
 Izzy Canillo as Young Prince Price
 Brenna Peñaflor as Young Charlie Sicat

SuperFerry 9 incident
On September 6, 2009, SuperFerry 9 capsized off the southwest coast of Zamboanga Peninsula with 971 people on board. Among the passengers were 29 crewmembers of Star Cinema. The employees shot some scenes in General Santos City for Ang Tanging Pamilya: A Marry Go Round. 1 crew member died in the accident. Estrada already appealed to the management of SuperFerry to help the victims. 11 of the Star Cinema crew members have been accounted for as of posting.

Alvin Despa, one of the passengers and an employee of Star Cinema, called DZMM and said many of the passengers were roused from their sleep after they felt the ship tilt. The crew on board the ship also included its art department staff. The crew brought with them equipment, vehicles and costumes which all ended up sinking with the ship. At 3 A.M., Tess Fuentes, operations director of Star Cinema, said she received a call saying that all passengers had already been given life jackets.

See also
 Philippine films of the 2000s

References

External links
 

2009 films
2000s Tagalog-language films
2009 comedy films
Star Cinema films
Philippine comedy films
Films directed by Wenn V. Deramas